Cloud Nine is the debut studio album by Norwegian DJ and record producer Kygo and features the likes of Maty Noyes, Conrad Sewell, Parson James, Tom Odell, Foxes, Matt Corby, Rhodes, Will Heard, Julia Michaels, James Vincent McMorrow, Kodaline, Labrinth, John Legend and Angus & Julia Stone. It was released on 13 May 2016 by Sony Music and Ultra Music.

Singles
The album's first single, "Firestone", featuring Australian singer Conrad Sewell, was released on 1 December 2014. The debut single was an international success, charting in over 14 countries and peaked at number one on the Norwegian Singles Chart. "Firestone" notably popularized the genre of tropical house in 2014. In late 2015, it was confirmed to be the lead single from the album.

The second single, "Stole the Show", featuring Parson James, was released on 23 March 2015. It peaked at number one on Norwegian, French, and Swedish charts and reached the top 10 in more than 20 countries.

"Nothing Left", featuring Will Heard was released as the third single on 31 July 2015. The single charted on several international charts and peaked at number one on the Norwegian Singles Chart.

"Stay", featuring Maty Noyes, was released as the fourth single on 4 December 2015. The single peaked at number two on the Norwegian Singles Chart.

"Raging", featuring Kodaline, is the fifth single from the album on 1 April 2016, it was also released as the second promotional single from the album.

"Carry Me", featuring Julia Michaels, is the sixth single from the album on 12 August 2016.

Promotional singles
After the delayed release of his album, Kygo announced that he would release three promotional singles leading to the release of the album. The first promotional single, "Fragile", was released on 18 March 2016. It is a collaboration with Labrinth.

The third promotional single, "I'm in Love", featuring vocals from James Vincent McMorrow, was released on 22 April 2016. Its music video was released on 20 May 2016 and served as the follow-up to "Raging".

Promotion
Cloud Nine was supported by Kygo's first world tour. The tour landed in 22 cities across North America and Europe, including stops at Barclays in New York City, Heineken Music Hall in Amsterdam and Le Zenith in Paris.

Critical reception

Cloud Nine received mixed reviews from music critics. David Smith from the London Evening Standard gave the album two out of five stars, stating that Cloud Nine is "superficially pretty with little of real substance."

Track listing

Charts

Weekly charts

Year-end charts

Certifications

Release history

References

2016 debut albums
Kygo albums
Sony Music albums
Ultra Records albums